Robert Gordon Sorenson (19 September 1923 – 25 May 2016) was a New Zealand rugby union player and coach, and a cricketer.

Rugby union
A fullback, Sorenson represented  at a provincial level between 1942 and 1949, appearing in 40 matches and scoring 176 points. He went on to coach the Auckland representative team from 1964 until 1966. Sorenson was a life member of the New Zealand Barbarian Rugby Club, serving as club captain between 1954 and 1959, and president from 1969 to 1970.

Cricket
Sorenson played two first-class cricket matches for Auckland in the 1943/44 season. A slow left-arm orthodox bowler, he took six wickets at an average of 31.66, and recorded best bowling figures of 3 for 43. With the bat he scored 58 runs at an average of 29.00, and a high score of 29.

Death
Sorenson died in Auckland on 25 May 2016.

See also
 List of Auckland representative cricketers

References

1923 births
2016 deaths
New Zealand cricketers
Auckland cricketers
Cricketers from Auckland
Auckland rugby union players
Rugby union fullbacks
New Zealand rugby union players
New Zealand rugby union coaches
People educated at Sacred Heart College, Auckland